The Martin Luther Church is a church building in Nyhem in Halmstad, Sweden. Belonging to the Martin Luther Parish of the Church of Sweden, it was opened on 19 December 1970.

References

External links

1970 establishments in Sweden
20th-century Church of Sweden church buildings
Churches in Halland County
Churches completed in 1970
Halmstad
Churches in the Diocese of Gothenburg